Rossana Rosado is an American newspaper editor, publisher and producer who served as the Secretary of State of New York. On February 3, 2016, Governor Andrew Cuomo appointed Rosado as the Secretary of State. She was unanimously confirmed by the New York State Senate on June 15, 2016. She attended Pace University, where she earned  a B.A. in journalism.

Career
Rossana Rosado began her career at El Diario La Prensa starting as a journalist in the early 1980s. She then was publisher and CEO of the newspaper company in 1999. She was the first woman to serve as an editor and publisher of the second largest Spanish-language newspaper in the country, El Diario La Prensa. In 1992, Rosado was appointed vice president for public affairs at the Health and Hospitals Corporation for the City of New York by Mayors David Dinkins and Rudy Giuliani. Rosado has served on the board of the Port Authority of New York and New Jersey from 2012 and 2015, and is member of the college's foundation board of trustees since 2012.

Awards
Rosado has won an Emmy for producing public service announcements that highlighted organizations that helped children in need. She also won the STAR award from the NY Women's Agenda, the Peabody Award for Journalism, and the NY Press Club President's award.

Personal life
Rosado is married and has two children and she currently lives in White Plains, New York.

References

External links

1961 births
21st-century American politicians
21st-century American women politicians
Hispanic and Latino American politicians
Hispanic and Latino American women in politics
Living people
New York (state) Democrats
Pace University alumni
People from White Plains, New York
Secretaries of State of New York (state)